Nelke, Phillips & Bendix was an important stockbroking firm in the City of London from the 1890s through to the First World War.

Origins
The firm's founders were Paul Solomon Nelke (1860-1925)  and Frederick Solomon Phillips. Paul Nelke had been born in Berlin and had relocated to the City of London becoming a member of the London Stock Exchange. Phillips retired from the business in late 1907. At the time the partners were shown as Nelke, David Nunes da Costa, Joseph Ernest Rosen, John Richard Ryman, John Henry Millns and John Spencer-Churchill.

The firm became prominent dealers in the mining share market in the 1890s and dealt, at times, for King Edward VII.

The firm had its offices at Throgmorton Avenue and at Warnford Court in the City of London.  
  
Jack Churchill, the brother of Winston Churchill was a partner of Nelke, Phillips. As a consequence, the investment activities of the future prime minister were channeled through the firm.

Hermann Marx (died 1947), a distant relative of Karl Marx joined Nelke, Phillips as a clerk at age 18 and became a partner at the age of 26.

Fate
In March 1917, in the midst of World War I, a petition was raised by the Stock Exchange Anti-German Union, listing 142 members mainly of alien enemy birth, calling on the  Committee for General Purposes not to re-elect them. As a result some fifty members, including prominent brokers such at Paul Nelke, Julius Stamm and Louis Fleischmann, were not reelected.   

With Paul Nelke deemed to be an enemy alien, this precipitated the partners and staff of Nelke, Phillips to seek other ways of undertaking business.

Ongoing
The important stockbroking firm of Vickers, da Costa was founded in 1917 by the former partners and staff of Nelke, Phillips, with the founding partners being Horace Vickers, Reggie Vickers, David Nunes da Costa and JH Millns. Jack Churchill became a partner of the new firm in 1921.

Despite Nelke's exclusion from the stockmarket, he converted Nelke, Phillips into a merchant bank and it continued as such until 1921. His daughter, Maude Julia Augusta Nelke married Gilbert Russell, the cousin of the Duke of Bedford, Herbrand Russell, 11th Duke of Bedford. Nelke had prospered in the post-war oil boom and decided to set up his son-in-law (who had been a London representative for Salomon Brothers) as a stockbroker. From this decision arose the firm of Cull & Company in 1921, with Russell, Hugh Micklem,  Anders Eric Knös Cull (a Swede) and Hermann Marx as the founders. Micklem and Cull had both been successful oil share jobbers. This new firm had a close relationship with Calouste Gulbenkian. Ian Fleming was one of the firm's employees in the 1930s Other notable employees included the philosopher and former SOE and MI6 agent A.J. “Freddie” Ayer.
 
Eventually, Cull & Co. was sold to and absorbed by Morgan Grenfell in 1943.

References

Further reading
 Mr Five Per Cent: The many lives of Calouste Gulbenkian, the world's richest man, Jonathan Conlin, Profile Books, 2019
 The London Stock Exchange: A History, Ranald Michie, OUP Oxford, 2001

Stockbrokers
Investment management companies of the United Kingdom
Investment banks
Banks of the United Kingdom
Financial services companies based in the City of London
Brokerage firms